Georgy Vaganovich Sayadov (born 12 February 1931) is a retired flyweight freestyle wrestler from Azerbaijan who competed for the Soviet Union at the 1952 Summer Olympics. He won his first four bouts, but then lost to Mahmoud Mollaghasemi and ended in a fourth place. Domestically he won the Soviet title in 1953 and 1958. Sayadov was born to the Armenian wrestler Vagan Sayadyan, who changed his last name to Sayadov to blend in Azerbaijan. Georgy had four brothers, and one of them, Armais, competed in Greco-Roman wrestling at the 1964 Olympics.

References

1931 births
Living people
Olympic wrestlers of the Soviet Union
Wrestlers at the 1952 Summer Olympics
Sportspeople from Baku
Armenian wrestlers